The Digital Pioneers Academy is an information technology-focussed high school in Southeast, Washington D.C.

The free public charter school is led by Mashea Ashton, the founder and Chief Executive Officer. The school is focussed on teaching students modern technology and innovation. Most of the students are from the under-resourced areas east of the Anacostia River in Wards 7 and 8; spaces at the school are awarded via a lottery system.

The school has two campuses, the Capitol Hill campus serves students in Eighth grade to Tenth grade.

History 
The school was the target of telephone bomb threat in February 2022.

English teacher Keenan Anderson died in January 2023 while visiting family in Los Angeles, after being repeatedly tasered by Los Angeles Police Department while being arrested.

References

External links 
 Digital Pioneers Academy official website

Charter schools in the District of Columbia
Public high schools in Washington, D.C.